The Wieprz is a river in central-eastern Poland.

Wieprz may also refer to the following villages:
Wieprz, Lesser Poland Voivodeship (south Poland)
Wieprz, Silesian Voivodeship (south Poland)
Wieprz, Warmian-Masurian Voivodeship (north Poland)